Sjef Hensgens (born 27 January 1948) is a retired Dutch middle-distance runner. He competed at the 1972 Summer Olympics in the 800 m event, but failed to reach the final, placing 4th in his heat with a time of 1:51,2.

References

1948 births
Living people
Athletes (track and field) at the 1972 Summer Olympics
Dutch male middle-distance runners
Olympic athletes of the Netherlands
People from Gulpen-Wittem
20th-century Dutch people
21st-century Dutch people
Sportspeople from Limburg (Netherlands)